South Carolina Highway 336 (SC 336) is a  primary state highway in the U.S. state of South Carolina. It serves to connect Ridgeland with nearby U.S. Route 321 (US 321) and SC 462.

Route description

SC 336 is a two-lane rural highway predominantly throughout its route. Starting at US 321 in Tillman, it goes east into downtown Ridgeland, then continuing east to SC 462 in Old House where it ends. Its routing east of Interstate 95 (I-95) takes a series of turns, making the highway's routing a bit disjointing.

The highway connects to several historic places, including Jasper County Courthouse, Church of the Holy Trinity, Honey Hill-Boyd's Neck Battlefield, White Hall Plantation House Ruins and the Old House Plantation.

History
The highway was established in 1938 as a new primary routing from SC 33 (today's US 321) in Tillman, to US 17/SC 36 (today's US 17/US 278) in Ridgeland.  In 1997, it replaced US 278 from Ridgeland to SC 462 in Old House.

Junction list

Ridgeland connector route

South Carolina Highway 336 Connector (SC 336 Conn.) is a connector route that is in the western part of Ridgeland and in the northwestern part of Jasper County. It is known as Russell Street and is an unsigned highway.

The connector begins at an intersection with the SC 336 mainline (West Main Street). It travels to the north-northeast through a residential area of the city. At 3rd Avenue, it intersects U.S. Route 278 Connector (US 278 Conn.). Here, SC 336 Conn. ends, and US 278 Conn. utilizes the remainder of Russell Street.

See also

References

External links

 
 Mapmikey's South Carolina Highways Page: SC 336

336
Transportation in Jasper County, South Carolina
U.S. Route 278